Morocco first participated at the Olympic Games in 1960, and has sent athletes to compete in every Summer Olympic Games since then, except when they participated in the American-led boycott of the 1980 Summer Olympics. Morocco also boycotted the 1976 Games, withdrawing after having initially sent a delegation. In doing so, Morocco joined the boycott of the Games by most African countries, in protest against New Zealand's participation following an All Blacks rugby match, unrelated to the Olympics, against an apartheid team from South Africa. Only one Moroccan representative had time to compete before his country's withdrawal: Abderahim Najim took part in the Men's Light Flyweight event in boxing, and lost his first and only match.

Morocco has also participated in the Winter Olympic Games on seven occasions since 1968.

Moroccan athletes have won a total of twenty three medals, nineteen in athletics and four in boxing.  Hicham El Guerrouj, with two gold medals and one silver medal, Saïd Aouita, with one gold and one bronze, and Hasna Benhassi, with one silver and one bronze, are Morocco's three multiple medal winners. 

The Moroccan Olympic Committee was created in 1959.

Medals

Medals by Summer Games

Medals by Winter Games

Medals by Summer Sport

Athletes with most medals  

Notes: in Khaki the athletes still in activity.

List of medalists

See also 
 List of flag bearers for Morocco at the Olympics
 Morocco at the Paralympics
 Morocco at the Youth Olympics
 :Category:Olympic competitors for Morocco

References

External links